Cyclone Lake is a lake in Garfield County, Utah, United States.

Cyclone Lake was so named on account of the lake having been visited by a tornado (cyclone).

References

Lakes of Utah
Lakes of Garfield County, Utah